RadicalMedia is an independent global media and creative production company. Founded by Jon Kamen and Frank Scherma, the company develops, creates, and produces film, television, advertising, branded content, music videos, live events, design, digital and immersive experiences. 

In 2010, Fremantle purchased a 60 percent stake of the company. In 2015, RadicalMedia bought back shares of the company's shares, retaining its majority ownership.

Entertainment

RadicalMedia develops, creates and produces, film, television, and digital content across all forms of media and distribution platforms. The company received its fourth Academy Award nomination and second win with Summer of Soul on Hulu and Disney+. RadicalMedia's other Academy Award was for The Fog of War and two other nominations for Joe Berligner's Paradise Lost 3 and Netflix's first original documentary feature, What Happened, Miss Simone?.

Other projects include Emmy-winning David Byrne's American Utopia and Spring Awakening: Those You've Known on HBO and HBO Max; the Tony Award-winning hit musical Come From Away on Apple TV+; the record-breaking series Crime Scene, Jeffrey Epstein: Filthy Rich, and Conversations with a Killer on Netflix; Doris Kearns Goodwin's Abraham Lincoln and Theodore Roosevelt on History Channel, as well as Grant, the network's highest performing mini-series of all time. RadicalMedia also produced Concert for George; Metallica: Some Kind of Monster on Metallica, the pilot episode of Mad Men; and the A&E documentary Under African Skies on Paul Simon's Graceland journey, directed by Joe Berlinger. The company also produced Ron Howard's documentary Made in America, a festival headlining Jay-Z and Pearl Jam in Philadelphia; the docu-series Abstract: The Art of Design, Oh, Hello on Broadway, Bobby Kennedy for President, and My Next Guest Needs No Introduction with David Letterman on Netflix; Lebron James: More Than an Athlete for ESPN; and Hamilton's America for PBS, a documentary about Lin-Manuel Miranda's Broadway musical, Hamilton. The company also shot three performances of the show with the original principal cast at the Richard Rodgers Theatre in New York City during a week in the summer of 2016. That footage was edited together into a full-length film recording of the musical, which was then offered for bidding to major film studios. Eventually, the distribution rights were purchased by the Walt Disney Studios on February 3, 2020, for a total of $75 million. The film, Hamilton was made available to stream exclusively on Disney+ on July 3, 2020.

In July 2012, RadicalMedia launched THNKR, a YouTube Channel highlighting innovative people, stories, and ideas. Since its launch, THNKR has attracted 900,000 subscribers and over 150 million video views.

Branded entertainment

RadicalMedia produces original content and brand-driven entertainment for its partners and advertisers.  Productions include Nike Battlegrounds, a 3-season street basketball competition series, that aired on MTV from 2004 to 2007 and won the ANA/ACIP Battle of the Brands in 2006. Iconoclasts, a series featuring unscripted encounters between influential cultural figures, was produced by RadicalMedia for the Sundance Channel in partnership with Grey Goose Entertainment, and won the One Show Entertainment Award in 2011. In 2007, the company also worked with BBH to develop and produce the MTV scripted reality dating series The Gamekillers, which was sponsored by Axe deodorant and won a Bronze Lion at the 2008 Cannes Lions International Advertising Festival. In 2011, RadicalMedia and Ogilvy & Mather produced a short documentary series for IBM, "Watson", which won two PR Lions at the Cannes Lions International Advertising Festival. In 2012, Nissan, Sony PlayStation, TBWA\Chiat\Day and RadicalMedia won three Cannes Lions for "GT Academy" for Speed.

Music videos
RadicalMedia has produced music videos, original programming, and digital content for a variety of artists. In 2010, the company produced "The Johnny Cash Project", a crowd-sourced music video of Johnny Cash's "Ain't No Grave" directed by Chris Milk, which enabled audiences to interact with and become immersed in the video's creation. "The Johnny Cash Project" received multiple awards, including a Silver Cyber Lion, a Grammy nomination for Best Short Form Music Video, the Innovation Award at the UK Music Video awards, Best in Art at the SXSW Interactive Awards, a Gold Andy, a Gold Clio, and four Webbys.

Other productions include the Major Lazer docu-special "Chasing the Sound" following the trio's epic tour through West Africa; the visuals for every track on Orville Peck's album "Bronco" and previous single "Queen of the Rodeo", which appeared on his debut album "Pony"; Love Mansuy's music video for "Count On You"; Tom Misch's video for "What Kinda Music"; Mumford & Son's video for "Woman"; Lil Xan and Charli XCX's video for "Moonlight"; Sia's video for "Rainbow"; and Katy Perry and Nicki Minaj's music video for "Swish".

Controversy
In April 2011, the company took legal action to prevent a collective of radical media organizations from using the trademarked phrase "radical media" to promote their upcoming "Radical Media Conference" in London, which was consequently renamed to the "Rebellious Media Conference". On May 3, 2011, a group held a demonstration outside RadicalMedia's London offices. Protester Ewa Jasiewicz said the company had "locked off the term 'radical media' away from anybody else using it, including activists who really do make radical media".

References

External links 
 

Transmedia storytelling
Mass media companies based in New York City
RTL Group
Video production companies
1993 establishments in the United States